Sunerah Binte Kamal (Bengali: সুনেরাহ বিনতে কামাল) is a Bangladeshi model, actress, and dancer. She won National Film Award for Best Actress for her debut film No Dorai (2019).

Career
Sunerah made her debut in the film of No Dorai in 2019, which earned her a National Film Award for Best Actress.

Filmography

Films

Short films

Awards and nomination
 National Film Award for Best Actress. (No Dorai), 2019

References

Living people
Best Actress National Film Awards (Bangladesh) winners
1995 births